The 1966 Auburn Tigers football team represented Auburn University in the 1966 NCAA University Division football season. It was the Tigers' 75th overall and 33rd season as a member of the Southeastern Conference (SEC). The team was led by head coach Ralph "Shug" Jordan, in his 16th year, and played their home games at Cliff Hare Stadium in Auburn and Legion Field in Birmingham, Alabama. They finished with a record of four wins and six losses (4–6 overall, 1–5 in the SEC).

Schedule

References

Auburn
Auburn Tigers football seasons
Auburn Tigers football